Truist Stadium, formerly Aggie Stadium, is a 21,500-seat multi-purpose stadium in Greensboro, North Carolina. It is located at the north end of the North Carolina A&T State University campus.

W. Edward Jenkins, a North Carolina A&T alumnus and architect, designed the stadium. Opened in 1981, the stadium is the home of the North Carolina A&T Aggies football team and the Irwin Belk Olympic class track. In addition, Truist Stadium features a "Fitness and Wellness Center". This  fitness facility sits behind the scoreboard in the stadium's northeastern corner.

History
Before the construction of Truist Stadium, North Carolina A&T Aggies played their home football games at Greensboro's War Memorial Stadium, which was also home to Greensboro's minor league baseball franchise. The university saw a great need to have an on campus stadium that could hold the growing number of fans attending home football games. The stadium was designed by architect W. Edward Jenkins, a North Carolina A&T alumnus, and was constructed at a cost of more than $2.5 million. The stadium opened in 1981 and the first game played there was on September 12, 1981, against rival Winston Salem State University to an overflow crowd of more than 23,000 fans. To date, the largest single game attendance at Truist Stadium was set in 2001 when 34,769 people were in attendance for a football game against the Rattlers of Florida A&M University.

Expansion and improvements

The original plans for the stadium called for a seating capacity of 20,000 people, but due to the increased cost of materials, the plan was scaled back to 17,500. For the first 14 years of operation, the stadium's permanent seating capacity stood at 17,500. However, in 1995 the stadium underwent a major expansion in which 5,000 additional seats were added in the south end zone area to complete the current horseshoe shape and raise the seating capacity to over 21,000. In 1999 a donation by the Ford Motor Company allowed for the construction of stadium lights for night games and an electronic marquee outside the stadium grounds.

In 2001, the university opened the Joseph and Kathleen Bryan Fitness and Wellness Center behind the stadium's northeast end zone. Three years later, the Irwin Belk Track was finally completed. The facility is named after the former president of Belk Department Stores and a major financial contributor to the project. the Mondo Super X Performance track features eight 48-inch lanes and wide turns. During the 2004 off season, the scoreboard in the north endzone was removed and replaced with a digital scoreboard and replay screen from daktronics. The most visible addition to Truist Stadium is the  Sky Box complete with a Chancellor's Suite, facilities for press and coaches, as well as leasable luxury suites. The project was designed by Jason H. Jones, AIA, with Clark Nexsen's Charlotte Office, and was completed in April in time for the 2012 Football season. For the 2015 season, Aggievision was upgraded with a larger HD replay screen and LED panels.

Non football events
 International Friendship & Freedom Games (2009, 2010)
 Mid-Eastern Athletic Conference Outdoor Track and Field Championships (2008–Present)
 Murray Neely Invitational (2009-2010)
 NCAA Division I Track and Field Championships – East Regional (2006, 2009–Present)
 NCHSAA Track and Field Championships (2005–present)
 New Balance Outdoor Nationals (formerly the Nike Outdoor Nationals) (2005–Present)
 Russell E. Blunt East Coast Invitational (2004–2005)
 State Games of North Carolina (2007)
 USATF National Junior Olympic Track & Field Championships (2006–Present)

Photo gallery

See also
 List of NCAA Division I FCS football stadiums

References

External links
 Truist Stadium – website

College football venues
North Carolina A&T Aggies football
Sports venues in Greensboro, North Carolina
Athletics (track and field) venues in North Carolina
College track and field venues in the United States
Multi-purpose stadiums in the United States
1981 establishments in North Carolina
American football venues in North Carolina
Sports venues completed in 1981